Louis Delluc (14 October 1890 – 22 March 1924) was an Impressionist French film director, screenwriter and film critic.

Biography
Delluc was born in Cadouin in 1890. His family moved to Paris in 1903. After graduating from the university, he became a literary critic. During the First World War, he was married to the Belgian actress Ève Francis, who acted in many of his films.

In 1917, Delluc began his career in film criticism. He went on to edit Le Journal du Ciné-club and Cinéa, establish film societies, and direct seven films. He was one of the early Impressionist filmmakers, along with Abel Gance, Germaine Dulac, Marcel L'Herbier, and Jean Epstein. His films are notable for their focus on ordinary events and the natural setting rather than on adventures and antics. Many of his early film writings for French newspapers were collected in the volume Cinema et cie (1919). He also wrote one of the first books on Charlie Chaplin (1921; translated into English in 1922).

Delluc directed his seventh film, L'Inondation (The Flood), in 1924. Filming took place in very poor weather conditions and Delluc contracted pneumonia. He died in Paris several weeks later, before the film was released.

The Prix Louis-Delluc, created in 1937, is named in his honour.

Filmography
 1920 : Fumée noire 
 1920 : Le Silence
 1920 : Le Chemin d'Ernoa
 1921 : Fièvre
 1921 : Le Tonnerre
 1922 : La Femme de nulle part
 1924 : L'Inondation

References

External links

 
 

French film directors
1890 births
1924 deaths